Padinjarechira is one of the four oldest ponds in Thrissur city of Kerala in India. It was built by Shakthan Thampuran (1751-1805) and is one of Thrissur's famous landmarks. It is owned by Vadakke Madhom.

History
Sakthan Thampuran, Maharaja of Cochin, built four ponds in Thrissur city for water management and irrigation purpose in his regime. They are Vadakkechira, Padinjarechira, Thekkechira and Kizakechira. Among these, the latter two have been ceased to exist.

References

Ponds in Thrissur
Parks in Thrissur
Geography of Thrissur
Tourist attractions in Thrissur